Ronald Winthrop Jones (July 5, 1931 – September 27, 2022) was an influential international trade economist and retired Xerox Professor of Economics at the University of Rochester. His highly acclaimed book Globalization and the Theory of Input Trade summarizes much of his past work and also discusses the recent market trend toward fragmentation and outsourcing of the production process.

Professor Jones also is an author of World Trade and Payments(with Richard E. Caves and Jeffrey Frankel), an upper-level college textbook that focuses on international economics.

He earned an A.B. from Swarthmore College in 1952 and a Ph.D. from the Massachusetts Institute of Technology in 1956.

See also

References

External links
Department of Economics, University of Rochester

1931 births
2022 deaths
Writers from Louisville, Kentucky
Members of the United States National Academy of Sciences
Fellows of the Econometric Society
Massachusetts Institute of Technology alumni
21st-century American economists
20th-century American economists
Swarthmore College alumni
Trade economists
University of Rochester faculty
Fellows of the American Academy of Arts and Sciences
Distinguished Fellows of the American Economic Association